Buzz'd Out! also known as Buzz'd Out Live!, is a 2018 American reality television game show produced by Pasadena Media, in which contestants compete with each other in challenges and trivia by pressing the buzzer before their component.

Background 
The game show was produced by Pasadena Media and airs on Pasadena Media's The Arroyo Channel.

Pasadena Media Studios and the Hollywood Fringe Festival is where the game show was filmed.

Format 
For every episode, contestants battle each other similar to the Jeopardy's trivia game layout while doing crazy things in order to buzz in their response to the questions and win awards.

Production 
 Roe Moore, producer / co-creator
 Benjamin Budzak, co-creator
 Greg Vanholsbeck, game assistant
 Marylee Herrmann, contestant producer
 Miles Constantine Mathews, stage manager

Cast 

 Benjamin Budzak as Himself (host)
 Bill Mehner as Himself (announcer)

References

External links 
 
2018 American television series debuts
2010s American game shows
English-language television shows
2010s American reality television series